Suryakumar Ashok Yadav (born 14 September 1990) is an Indian international cricketer. A right-handed batsman plays for Mumbai Indians in the Indian Premier League and for the Mumbai cricket team in Indian domestic cricket.

He made his One Day International (ODI) debut for India on 18 July 2021 against Sri Lanka. In November 2022, Yadav was ranked as the number one T20 International batsman.

Early life
He was raised in Mumbai. His father migrated to Mumbai from  Uttar Pradesh, for job in the Bhabha Atomic Research Centre. That time Yadav was 10 years old. Later Surya joined Indian Railways as Locopilot in Gorakhpur region. Surya learnt the game while playing in the streets of Chembur. At the age of 10, his father saw his inclination towards the game and enrolled him in a cricket camp in BARC colony in Anushakti Nagar. He then went to Elf Vengsarkar Academy of former international cricketer, Dilip Vengsarkar and played the age group cricket in Mumbai. He is an alumnus of Pillai College of Arts, Commerce and Science.

On 7 July 2016 Yadav married Devisha Shetty. The couple first met in 2010 at a college programme. Shetty is also trained dancer and a dance coach.

Career

Suryakumar Yadav played club cricket for Parsi Gymkhana Cricket Club in Mumbai  Apart from Parsi Gymkhana he had played for Bharat Petroleum Corporation Limited team and clubs such as Shivaji Park Gymkhana club and Dadar Union club in Mumbai's club cricket.

He is one of the senior and regular member of Mumbai Ranji team. He was a captain of Mumbai cricket team for brief period of time in Ranji trophy. Amid 2014–15 Ranji Trophy season Mumbai Cricket Association (MCA) removed him from captaincy and dropped from the team in 2018-19 season. MCA's selection committee selected him and appointed as captain for 2019-20 of the tournament.

Suryakumar Yadav was captain of Mumbai team in 2020–21 Syed Mushtaq Ali Trophy.

In 2021, playing for his club, Parsi Gymkhana, he scored 249 runs in final match against Payyade Sports Club in 'Police Shield' tournament at the Police Gymkhana ground, Mumbai. Parsee Gymkhana has won this tournament last time way back in 1956, created the history by becoming the first club to win back-to-back trophies in 3 different format in single season. Yadav won the best batsman of the final award.

In October 2018, he was named in India C's squad for the 2018–19 Deodhar Trophy. In October 2019, he was named in the India C squad for the 2019–20 Deodhar Trophy.

After Scoring Consistantly In First Class & Domestic Cricket Suryakumar Finally Got his First National Call up in February 2021 when he was named In India's T20I squad for 5 match T20I Series Which Take place in march 2021

Indian Premier League

He received an IPL contract from Mumbai Indians (MI) for the 2012 season. He played just one match in the season and was dismissed without scoring.

He was bought by Kolkata Knight Riders in the 2014 IPL auctions. He made headlines in IPL 2015 when he hit a match-winning 20 ball 46 runs with five sixes against MI at Eden Gardens. He became the team's vice-captain and played regularly.

After impressive stint with the Mumbai Indians, he was retained by them ahead of 2022 season mega auction for INR 8 Cr. He was ruled out from IPL 2022 due injury in left forearm.

Mumbai Indians again retain Suryakumar Yadav for INR 8 Crore in TATA IPL 2023. Being ranked as ICC No.1 T20 batsman and awarded the Mens Cricketer of the Year 2022, he is one of the most valuable players in IPL 2023.

International career
In February 2021, he was named in India's Twenty20 International (T20I) squad for their series against England. It was his maiden international call-up to the India cricket team. He made his T20I debut for India on 14 March 2021, against England. He then played the fourth game of the series on 18 March and got his first opportunity to bat, and hit the first ball he faced in international cricket for a six, becoming the first Indian to do so in T20 International, and went on to score a half-century. The next day, he was named in India's One Day International (ODI) squad for their series against England. His game changing performances at No. 3 led him to being described as an "X Factor" player by his captain.

In June 2021, he was named in India's One Day International (ODI) and Twenty20 International (T20I) squads for their series against Sri Lanka. He made his ODI debut on 18 July 2021, for India against Sri Lanka. On 21 July 2021, Yadav scored his maiden ODI fifty against Sri Lanka.

In July 2021, Suryakumar Yadav was called up as a replacement to India's Test squad for their series against England. In September 2021, Yadav was named in India's squad for the 2021 ICC Men's T20 World Cup. In November, he was added to India's Test squad for their series against New Zealand.

In June 2022, he was named in India's squad for their T20I series against Ireland.

In July 2022, Suryakumar Yadav scored his maiden T20I century against England at Trent Bridge in Nottingham, England scoring 117 off 55 balls. He is only the 5th Indian player to record a century in T20I, and only the 2nd to reach the mark batting 4th or lower. In October 2022, he became the fastest batsman to score 1000 runs in T20I's, reaching the mark in 573 balls against South Africa.

On 30 October 2022, Yadav was ranked first in the ICC T20I rankings for batsmen.

On 27 October 2022, Yadav scored the fourth fastest half-century by an Indian batsman at a T20 World Cup, and his first at a T20 World Cup, reaching the mark in 25 balls against Netherlands at Sydney Cricket Ground.

In November 2022, Suryakumar Yadav scored his second T20I century against New Zealand at Bay Oval in Mount Maunganui, New Zealand, scoring 111* off 51 balls with the help of 11 fours and 7 sixes, he became second Indian to score two centuries in T20Is in a calendar year and emulates Rohit Sharma's record.

In January 2023, Suryakumar scored the second fastest century by an Indian batter in T20 Internationals, his third of career, reaching the mark in 45 balls against Sri Lanka at Saurashtra Cricket Association Stadium in Rajkot, India. He broke KL Rahul's record of second fastest T20I century, who achieved this in 46 balls. Surya also won the ICC T20I Player of the year Award for his brilliant performance in 2022.

On 9 February 2023, he made his Test debut against Australia at Vidarbha Cricket Association Stadium, Nagpur.

Notes

References

External links 

SuryaKumar Yadav News on GreyObserver

1990 births
People from Maharashtra
Maharashtra cricketers
People from Mumbai
Living people
Indian cricketers
India One Day International cricketers
India Twenty20 International cricketers
Mumbai cricketers
Mumbai Indians cricketers
West Zone cricketers
India Blue cricketers
Kolkata Knight Riders cricketers
People from Ghazipur